Engifest is the annual cultural festival of Delhi Technological University (formerly Delhi College of Engineering). Usually held in the month of February, it is a three-day-long event. Started in 1974 by a group of enthusiastic students, it has attracted considerable media attention and numerous sponsors over time. Engifest attracts an attendance of more than 3,50,000 people from across the country. Students from more than 150 colleges participate in activities related to social problems, dance, music, quizzes, and several others.

Introduction
Engifest is one of the largest college cultural festivals of the country. It is a student-run non-profit organization which caters primarily to youth and its success. Engifest includes a variety of events such as car and bike show, drag racing, cultural performances, live wire-star night, rock shows, plays on social problems, dances, and others. In the past Engifest has been studded by artists like Sunidhi Chauhan, Vishal–Shekhar, Mohit Chauhan, Amit Trivedi, Papon (singer), Raftaar, Nucleya, Bassjackers, Quintino (DJ), DJ NYK, Boogie Frantick, Bhuvan Bam, VJ Bani, Aditi Arya, Salman Yusuff Khan, Kumar Vishwas, Piyush Mishra, Karan Kundra, Hard Kaur, Sidhu Moose Wala.

History
Engifest, otherwise known as Engineers' Fest is one of the oldest college cultural festivals in the country, dating back to 1974. It was first started by students of the Delhi Technological University (DTU), formerly known as Delhi College of Engineering.

In 2014, Engifest expanded its range of events and performances, featuring popular artists such as Mohit Chauhan and Hard Kaur. 2015, the following year, the festival continued to grow and improve, featuring performances from Raftaar, Manj Musik, and more. In 2017, the festival reached new heights, A thousand hearts sang along the rhymes of soulful poetry by Piyush Mishra, and grooved to the lively voice of Sunidhi Chauhan. Engifest 2018 saw its biggest lineup to date, with live performances from stand-up comedian Abijit Ganguly, musician Amit Trivedi and DJ MAG #35 Bassjackers.

Since the addition of Humor Fest to Engifest in 2018, the festival consistently showcased some of the most prominent artists in the industry. The likes of Anubhav Singh Bassi, Nishant Tanwar, Rahul Dua, Harsh Gujral, Samay Raina, and many others graced the stage, adding a dose of laughter and humor to the already dynamic and diverse festival lineup. This further boosted Engifest's popularity and attracted a larger audience. The comedic acts became a fan favorite, and the presence of renowned humorists elevated the festival's reputation even further. Today, The Humor Fest has become a staple of Engifest, contributing to its continued success and solidifying its position as one of the largest cultural festivals.

In 2019, the festival continued to raise the bar, featuring a live performance by DJ MAG #25, Quintino. The success of Engifest 2019 was further highlighted by the presence of Vishal and Shekhar, two prominent names in the music industry, who took the stage. Their performance added an extra layer of excitement and glamour to the already thriving festival, elevating the overall atmosphere. The fact that two renowned artists were willing to participate in Engifest speaks volumes about the festival's standing in the cultural landscape of India. The crowd was thoroughly entertained and left the festival with memories to last a lifetime. 

With YouTube gaining prominence as a platform, Engifest has also been able to attract many well-known YouTubers and influencers such as Elvish Yadav, Bhuvan Bam, The Screen Patti, Hasley India, Pataakha, Half Engineer, and Jatt Prabhjot. Their participation has added to the festival's diversity and increased its appeal. The presence of these digital celebrities has helped Engifest maintain its relevance and appeal to young, tech-savvy audiences, contributing to its continued success and growth. 

Engifest 2020 saw an all-time high footfall of over 1.5 lakh students and was marked by a series of electrifying performances by some of the biggest names in the music industry. Sidhu Moosewala took everyone on a rollercoaster ride with his popular Punjabi songs, while the soulful voice of Papon melted hearts with his soulful songs. Rapper Divine set the stage on fire with his tracks, and hip-hop giant King got everyone dancing. The festival was a true celebration of music, art, and culture and showcased the diversity and creativity of young people from across the country.

Festival Sponsors and Past Affiliates 
The festival's extensive reach and wide exposure across multiple platforms make it an ideal opportunity for companies. By sponsoring Engifest, businesses get access to a broad and varied crowd, providing them a budget-friendly and highly effective means of reaching their target audience.

Moreover, by supporting the festival, sponsors demonstrate their commitment to supporting education and cultural exchange. This enhances their reputation as responsible corporate organizations and helps foster bonds of trust in the community at large.

From the previous associations, Technology companies such as HP, Asus, Panasonic, Intex, Zebronics have demonstrated their innovative products and services to engage with a young and dynamic audience. These companies also use the festival as an opportunity to identify and nurture technical talent, which could add great value to their businesses.

Consumer goods companies such as Pepsi (our co-title sponsor in Engifest’20), Nestle, Bingo, Too Yumm have also been benefited to help them create a positive image and build brand loyalty among students and young professionals.

Automotive companies such as Maruti Suzuki Nexa, Honda & Hero have also promoted their latest vehicles & technologies through motocorp events and activities. These companies showcase their commitment to innovation and sustainability, which adds a great value to their brand image.

Our Engifest 2020’s title sponsor, ‘Resso’ is one big example of how our fest contributes to brand growth. Resso, a music streaming and social networking platform which allows users to stream and discover music, was launched in 2020 itself and ever since the collaboration, it has become a popular platform for music lovers in India. Engifest initiated about 50,000 downloads of the Resso app which significantly helped the brand gain momentum, increased exposure and its popularity. As of 2022, it is rated #2 on Play Store and #4 in App Store in the Music category and currently holds a rating of 4.2 with 3 million+ reviews.

The print media partner of Engifest is Hindustan Times whereas its prominent digital media partners include All India Radio, 9x Jalwa including others.

References

College festivals in India